The field hockey tournament at the 1972 Summer Olympics was the 12th edition of the field hockey event at the Summer Olympics.

The West German victory was the first title by a European nation since 1920, but this was marred by the behavior of Pakistani players, fans, and officials: during the last ten minutes of the gold-medal match, the umpires had to stop play twice so that Pakistani fans who had invaded the pitch could be removed, while Pakistani players and officials repeatedly remonstrated with the umpires throughout that time.   

At the final whistle, Pakistani fans and officials invaded the pitch and assaulted West German police and stadium security before storming the tournament officials' table and pouring a bucket of water over International Hockey Federation president Rene Frank, while the players stormed their locker room before proceeding to destroy it.

At the medal ceremony, the Pakistani players refused to wear their silver medals or face the West German flag as it was raised, and turned their backs as the West German national anthem was played.

The eleven Pakistani players were banned for life from their national team, but after a high-level apology, the ban was reduced to two years, and eight of them played at the 1976 Olympics.

Medalists

Umpires
On 25 October 1971, 13 umpires were appointed by the FIH. It was reported that 12 more umpires would be selected in February 1972.

 Charan Singh (KEN)
 Peter Lake (GBR)
 A. F. Lathouwers (NED)
 Sarosh Nagarwala (IND)
 Naqi (PAK)
 Andre Schittecalte (BEL)
 Fritz Seegers (FRG)
 Horacio Servetto (ARG)
 Vijayanathan (MAS)
 J. Richard Jewell (AUT)
 Luigi Tinti (ITA)
 Aziz Iskanbar (EGY)
 John Martens (SIN)

Squads

Results

Preliminary round

Pool A

Pool B

Classification round

Ninth to sixteenth place classification

Fifteenth and sixteenth place

Thirteenth and fourteenth place

Eleventh and twelfth place

Ninth and tenth place

Fifth to eighth place classification

Crossover

Seventh and eighth place

Fifth and sixth place

Medal round

Semi-finals

Bronze-medal match

Gold-medal match

Final rankings

Goalscorers

References

External links
 Official Olympic report

 
Field hockey at the Summer Olympics
1972 Summer Olympics events
1972 Summer Olympics
Summer Olympics